Bergondo is a municipality in province of A Coruña, in the autonomous community of Galicia in northwestern Spain. It has an area of 32.85 km2, a population of 6,413 (2004 estimate), and a population density of 195.22 people/km2

Demographics

Artistic heritage

Religious art
Among the religious monuments present in the municipality include:

References

Municipalities in the Province of A Coruña